Strawberry Patch Park is a  city park in Madison, Mississippi.  It contains a one-mile (1.6 km) running path, a pond used for fishing by children, ducks, geese, and a playground.  It is located at 271 St. Augustine Drive (the intersection of St. Augustine and Old Canton Road), across the Street from Madison-Ridgeland Academy (MRA).

It has been designated a Blue Star Memorial By-way, a tribute to the Armed Forces of America, by Northbay-Madison Garden Club, a National Garden Clubs, Inc. member.

References 

Parks in Mississippi
Protected areas of Madison County, Mississippi